ZUN may refer to:

ZUN (video game developer), the sole member of Team Shanghai Alice, an independent game developer of the Touhou Project series.
The IATA code of Black Rock Airport.
The ISO 639-2 code for the Zuni language.

See also
Zun, a type of Chinese ritual bronze or ceramic wine vessel